"Uno tranquillo" ("Quiet One") is a song by Italian singer Riccardo Del Turco, released as a single in 1967. It was not as successful as his previous single, "Figlio unico", which was a top-ten hit in Italy, and "Uno tranquillo" only peaked at number 21. However, the song is notable for being covered in English as "Suddenly You Love Me" by the Tremeloes and in French as "Siffler sur la colline" by Joe Dassin.

Track listing
7”: CGD / N 9658
 "Uno tranquillo" – 3:10
 "Allora hai vinto tu" – 3:15

The Tremeloes version

British band the Tremeloes released an English-language version of the song in January 1968. It became a top-ten hit in the UK and peaked at number 44 on the US Billboard Hot 100. It was an early example of British bubblegum pop.

Release
"Suddenly You Love Me" was released as a double A-sided single with "As You Are" in most countries. In the Netherlands and Germany, "As You Are" was promoted as the sole A-side and peaked at number 35 on the German Singles Chart. In the US and Canada, "Suddenly You Love Me" was released two weeks later than the UK, with the flip side "Suddenly Winter", which was the B-side to the band's previous single "Be Mine". In New Zealand, "Suddenly You Love Me" was released with the B-side "Negotiations in Soho Square", taken from the album Alan, Dave, Rick and Chip.

Reception
Reviewing for New Musical Express, Derek Johnson wrote that "Suddenly You Love Me" "exudes a wonderfully lighthearted atmosphere, with organ, rattling tambourine and handclaps providing a sizzling backcloth to the boys' spirited vocal". Whilst "As You Are" was described as being "much slower", "a rhythmic ballad with a descriptive lyric".

Billboard described is as "one of [the Tremeloes] most powerful entries to date" and as an "infectious and rhythmic rocker that should quickly surpass their "Even the Bad Times Are Good" and bring them back to the "Silence Is Golden" selling class". Cash Box wrote that "Happy bounce and a terrific up-tempo side done with mirthful group vocals and a soiid orchestral drive make it possibly the brightest side by the Tremeloes in a long while".

In a retrospective article, Robin Carmody of Freaky Trigger praised the song's "grinning rush" and grouped it among other early British bubblegum songs, like the Love Affair's "Everlasting Love" (1967) and the Casuals' "Jesamine" (1968), for their emerging sense of optimism, "not in a cloying or false way, but appealingly (and unreachably) pre-ironic."

Track listing
7": CBS /  3234
 "Suddenly You Love Me" – 2:45
 "As You Are" – 2:45

7": CBS /  BA-461174 (New Zealand)
 "Suddenly You Love Me" – 2:45
 "Negotiations in Soho Square" – 3:01

7": Epic /  5-10293 (US and Canada)
 "Suddenly You Love Me" – 2:45
 "Suddenly Winter" – 2:26

Charts

Joe Dassin version

French singer-songwriter Joe Dassin released a French-language version of the song as a single in March 1968 from his album Joe Dassin (Les Champs-Élysées). It was adapted into French by Jean-Michel Rivat and Frank Thomas and featured an orchestra conducted by Johnny Arthey.

Track listing
7": CBS / 3368
 "Siffler sur la colline" – 2:32
 "Comment te dire" – 2:55

Charts

Other versions
 In 1967, Dutch singer Ben Cramer released a Dutch-language version, titled "Zai zai zai", as his debut single, which peaked at number 12 on the Dutch Single Top 100 and number 7 on the Dutch Top 40.
 In 1968, Finnish singer Tapani Kansa released a Finnish-language version, titled "Päättyneet on päivät", as a single coupled with a cover of "Delilah". The single topped the Finnish Singles Chart.
 In 1968, Yugoslav band Crni Biseri released a Serbian-language version, titled "Nisam više taj". Their version became a nationwide hit in Yugoslavia.
 In 1994, Belgian band Chapionettes released a Dutch-language version, titled "Elke keer opnieuw", as a single, which peaked at number 13 on the Ultratop 50 Flanders.

References

1967 songs
1967 singles
Italian songs
Compagnia Generale del Disco singles
Songs written by Daniele Pace
Songs written by Mario Panzeri
Bubblegum pop songs